William Rollo Jr. (1892–1960) was a Scottish-born South African academic.

History
Rollo was born in 1892 in Glasgow and graduated from the University of Glasgow with an MA in classics in 1915. After the war he completed his DLitt in linguistics at Leiden University. His thesis was on the Marquina dialect of the Basque language. He immigrated to South Africa in 1925, where he was professor of classics, then Head of the Classics Department and Dean of the Faculty of Arts at the University of Cape Town until 1953, when he was invited to take up the post of interim principal of the University College of Rhodesia and Nyasaland, now the University of Zimbabwe.

A skilled linguist, he taught himself Japanese during the Second World War, so he could teach the rudiments of the language to South African pilots who were going to fight in the Far East.

Death

He died in 1960 in Grahamstown, while teaching classics at Rhodes University.

References

Heads of universities and colleges in Zimbabwe
Academic staff of the University of Cape Town
Scottish classical scholars
South African classical scholars
1892 births
1960 deaths
British emigrants to Rhodesia
Rhodesian emigrants to South Africa
Academic staff of Rhodes University
Academic staff of the University of Zimbabwe